Hristo Zlatanov (Bulgarian: Христо Златанов - born 21 April 1976) is a Bulgarian-Italian volleyball player. He is the son of Dimitar Zlatanov.

References

External links 

 
 

1976 births
Living people
Sportspeople from Sofia
Bulgarian men's volleyball players
Italian men's volleyball players
Olympic volleyball players of Italy
Volleyball players at the 2008 Summer Olympics
Bulgarian emigrants to Italy
Italian people of Bulgarian descent